opened in Hakone, Kanagawa Prefecture, Japan, in 2013. A private museum of Asian art with the largest indoor exhibition space in Hakone, extending over five floors, the collection of some 450 pieces centres on early modern and modern Japanese painting while also including Chinese bronzes, lacquer, ceramics, and Buddhist sculpture.

See also
 Pola Museum of Art

References

External links

 Okada Museum of Art

Museums in Kanagawa Prefecture
Art museums and galleries in Japan
Buildings and structures in Hakone, Kanagawa
Art museums established in 2013
2013 establishments in Japan